Comon may be:
 short for Come On
 akin to C'mon
 a misspelling of Common
 the preterite plural form of Old English cuman ("to come")